Krakower See is a lake in the Rostock district in Mecklenburg-Vorpommern, Germany. At an elevation of 47.6 m, its surface area is 15.07 km².

External links 
 

Lakes of Mecklenburg-Western Pomerania